Group A of the 2007 Fed Cup Asia/Oceania Zone Group I was one of two pools in the Asia/Oceania Zone Group I of the 2007 Fed Cup. Five teams competed in a round robin competition, with the top team proceeding to their respective sections of the play-offs: the top team played for advancement to the World Group II Play-offs.

Thailand vs. Hong Kong

Uzbekistan vs. Singapore

South Korea vs. Singapore

Uzbekistan vs. Hong Kong

Thailand vs. Singapore

South Korea vs. Uzbekistan

Thailand vs. Uzbekistan

South Korea vs. Hong Kong

Thailand vs. South Korea

Hong Kong vs. Singapore

See also
Fed Cup structure

References

External links
 Fed Cup website

2007 Fed Cup Asia/Oceania Zone